The Glaser-Dirks DG-300 is a Standard Class single-seat high-performance glider built of glass-reinforced plastic. The DG-300 was designed by Wilhelm Dirks and manufactured by Glaser-Dirks Flugzeugbau's Slovenian partner company Elan (company). A total of 511 of all versions were built since production started in 1983. Representative contemporary types from competing manufacturers are the Rolladen-Schneider LS4 and the Schempp-Hirth Discus.

Design and development
The DG-300 has a flapless wing with triple taper based on the Hansjörg Streifeneder Falcon, and employs the HQ 21/II, a relatively thick profile (ca. 17.5%). This wing is 'blown' on the underside by 900 small holes to achieve a controlled transition from laminar to turbulent flow without additional drag. However, these holes are prone to clogging due to dirt, moisture and wing surface polishing, which makes them less effective over time. As with any racing glider, the thickness of the wing makes it relatively sensitive to performance degradation due to contamination by insect impacts or rain drops.

It is agile and a good climber, but slightly underperforms compared to its competitors in cruising flight, especially at higher speeds. The later DG-303 version with a new wing profile and winglets was developed that delivers higher performance at low to medium speeds plus increased aileron response. A fully aerobatic version (the Acro) was also sold, stressed for +7/-5g.

The DG-300 has typical DG features, which improve comfort and safety if at a performance cost. It has the large cockpit typical of DG giving excellent comfort, especially in high-altitude flight where the full-length canopy allows the feet to be warmed by sunlight. The view from the cockpit is superb, adding to the pleasure and safety of flight.

After the bankruptcy of Glaser-Dirks the newly founded DG Flugzeugbau GmbH took over the servicing of these gliders.

The operational limits were changed in April 2007 after a defect was detected on the main spar which affects unknown number of gliders. Aerobatic flight since then is not permitted, even for the Acro versions unless the spar is inspected and it is confirmed that the defect is not present. Repair is not possible and if the defect is found, the restrictions continue to apply.

Major features
Wings: spar of GRP rovings, wing shell of GRP / foam sandwich
Elevator: GRP shell
Rudder: GRP / foam sandwich
Fuselage: GRP shell
Conventional T-tail with fixed stabiliser and moving elevator
Retractable, sprung undercarriage in a sealed gear box
Large 5"x5" hub main wheel, 200x50 mm tail wheel
Parallelogram control stick
Automatic control connections
Self-trimming spring system for the elevator, with trigger release on the control stick
Schempp-Hirth air brakes on upper wing surface
Water ballast bags in the wings for 130 or 190 litres
Large canopy with low sill giving excellent in-flight visibility

Variants
DG-300 Elan
Initial production version
DG-300 Club Elan
With fixed undercarriage for club use
DG-300 Elan Acro
Fully aerobatic (restricted from aerobatic flight after 2007,unless you let DG do a resurge of the wing)
DG-303 Elan
With a new aerofoil section and optional winglets; available in standard, club and acro versions, built by the Slovenian company AMS-Flight until end of 2006

Specifications (DG-303 Elan)

See also

Sources

DG Flugzeugbau website
AMS-Flight
Richard Johnson, A FTE of the DG-300, Soaring, August 1985
Sailplane Directory
Main spar defect discussion
Technical Note 359-24

1970s German sailplanes
DG Flugzeugbau aircraft
T-tail aircraft
Aircraft first flown in 1983